Murrumburrah was a railway station on the Main South railway line in New South Wales, Australia. The station opened in 1879  and closed to passenger services in 1976. It was subsequently demolished and little trace remains.

References

Disused regional railway stations in New South Wales
Railway stations in Australia opened in 1879
Railway stations closed in 1976
Main Southern railway line, New South Wales